Ride On is the third studio album by American rock musician Izzy Stradlin. The album features Duff McKagan, Stradlin's former bandmate in Guns N' Roses.

Track listing
All lyrics and music by Izzy Stradlin.
"Ride On" - 5:27
"California" - 3:26
"Spazed" - 3:40
"Primitive Man" - 2:43
"Trance Mission" - 3:39
"Needles" - 4:06
"The Groper" - 3:33
"Here Comes the Rain" - 3:56
"Hometown" - 4:10
"Highway Zero" - 2:58

Personnel
Izzy Stradlin - lead vocals, rhythm guitar, lead guitar on "California"
Rick Richards - lead guitar
Duff McKagan - bass guitar
Taz Bentley - drums

References

1999 albums
Izzy Stradlin albums
Geffen Records albums